State Road 676 (SR 676) is a short state highway running west and east southeast of Tampa, Florida. It is named Causeway Boulevard, and serves as a connecting route to U.S. Route 41 Business (US 41 Bus.). Causeway Boulevard extends further east as a non-State Road that crosses over Interstate 75 (I-75) then turns into Lumsden Road which passes by the Westfield Shoppingtown Brandon.

Major intersections

References

External links

Routes 670 - 679 at Florida's Great Renumbering

676
676